Rajupalem may refer to:

 K. Rajupalem, Prakasam district, in the state of Andhra Pradesh, India
 Rajupalem, Guntur district, in the state of Andhra Pradesh, India
 Rajupalem, Kadapa district, in the state of Andhra Pradesh, India